Scott Simms  (born August 12, 1969) is a Canadian politician. He was the Liberal Member of Parliament for the Newfoundland and Labrador riding of Coast of Bays—Central—Notre Dame from 2004 until 2021.

Early life
Scott Simms was born on August 12, 1969, in Bishop's Falls, Newfoundland.

In 1990, while a student at Mount Allison University, Simms started in politics and campaigning when he acted as the official agent and campaign manager for Brian Gold the Rhinoceros Party candidate in a federal byelection in the Beauséjour riding. Simms graduated from Mount Allison University with a Bachelor in Commerce and Loyalist College in Journalism. Before entering elected politics, Simms worked for The Weather Network, prior to which he had worked as a radio reporter in Gander and Grand Falls-Windsor. He was an active campaigner for the "No" side in the 1995 Quebec referendum.

Politics
Simms was elected in the 2004 election and defeated four other candidates, including Conservative incumbent Rex Barnes. Simms was re-elected on Jan. 23, 2006, beating Conservative candidate Aaron Hynes by approximately 5,000 votes. Simms was re-elected in the 2008 federal election.

He was a member of the Standing Committee on Canadian Heritage and the Standing Committee on Fisheries and Oceans. Since January 18, 2006, he has been the critic for the Minister of Fisheries and Oceans. He was the critic for the Minister for the Atlantic Canada Opportunities Agency from February 23, 2006 until January 17, 2007.

Simms is also now known by a number of people who live on the west coast of Ireland following the voyage of one of his election posters across the Atlantic Ocean to Keem Bay in the village of Dooagh on Achill Island, County Mayo. The story was published by a local news paper called The Mayo News after a lifeguard at the beach, Conal Dixon, found the poster washed up on the sand.

On May 2, 2011, Simms was again re-elected, defeating Hynes in a re-match by approximately 9,200 votes, with a total of 17,895 votes in his riding.

In 2012, Simms was the only Liberal to join the Conservatives in voting to repeal Section 13 of the Canadian Human Rights Act, which dealt with communication of messages "likely to expose a person or persons to hatred or contempt."

In 2013, Simms was courted by the supporters in the Liberal Party of Newfoundland and Labrador to run for the provincial leadership in the 2013 leadership election, but ultimately declined to focus on federal politics. Simms was re-elected in the 2015 federal election.

In April 2018, Simms was removed as Chairman of the Standing Committee on Fisheries and Oceans as a result of voting in favour of a Conservative party motion opposing changes to the Canada Summer Jobs program.

Simms was re-elected in the 2019 federal election. Simms served as the Chair of the Standing Committee on Canadian Heritage.

Simms was defeated in the 2021 federal election losing to conservative candidate Clifford Small.

Electoral Record

	

|- bgcolor="white"

|align="left" colspan=2|Liberal hold
|align="right"|Swing
|align="right"| +21.7
|align="right"|

References

External links

Living people
Members of the House of Commons of Canada from Newfoundland and Labrador
Liberal Party of Canada MPs
Canadian television meteorologists
People from Bishop's Falls
1969 births
Mount Allison University alumni
Pelmorex people
21st-century Canadian politicians